The Dry Mills Schoolhouse is a historic schoolhouse on Game Farm Road in Gray, Maine.  Built about 1857, it is the town's last surviving single-room district schoolhouse, and is now a local museum.  The building was added to the National Register of Historic Places listings on December 13, 1996.

Description and history
The Dry Mills Schoolhouse is set on the north side of the main access road to the Maine Wildlife Park in northern Gray.  It is a single-story wood frame structure, with a front-facing gable roof, clapboard siding, and a granite block foundation.  Its modest Greek Revival styling includes paneled corner pilasters rising to a short frieze board, and short corner returns.  The main (south-facing) facade is relatively unadorned, with the entrance centered below a now-closed opening in the gable, with a flagpole mounted in front of it.  The interior has a vestibule across the southern side, which opens into the single classroom, which has vertical wainscoting below slate chalkboards.

The schoolhouse was built about 1857, and served as the district 3 school (out of 12 districts). It was used as a primary school until 1959, and was adapted for use as a preschool facility in the 1970s. It is the last of the town's district schools to survive. In the early 1990s it was restored to its original condition except for an outhouse that used to be attached to the building. The restorations cost approximately $12,000. There is a period wood stove, original chalk board and furnishings on the inside. There are also class pictures and textbooks of the time.

The school is now known as "The Dry Mills Schoolhouse Museum" and is still owned and operated by the town. The museum portrays a one-house schoolhouse of the mid-19th century. It is open to the public June through September on the weekends, but groups (such as school or camp field trips) are always able to visit.

See also
National Register of Historic Places listings in Cumberland County, Maine

References

External links
 A Brief History of the Dry Mills Schoolhouse Museum

Former school buildings in the United States
Museums in Cumberland County, Maine
Education museums in the United States
History museums in Maine
Defunct schools in Maine
School buildings completed in 1857
Gray, Maine
One-room schoolhouses in Maine
School buildings on the National Register of Historic Places in Maine
National Register of Historic Places in Cumberland County, Maine
1857 establishments in Maine